The House of Dreux was a cadet branch of the Capetian dynasty. It was founded by Robert I, Count of Dreux, a son of Louis VI of France, who was given the County of Dreux as his appanage.

The Counts of Dreux were relatively minor nobles in France. The senior comital line became extinct in 1345. In 1212 the French king needed an obedient vassal to marry Alix, Duchess of Brittany and turned to his cousin Peter, a younger son of the Count of Dreux. Peter's marriage to the heiress of Brittany placed the House of Dreux in one of the most important fiefs of France. Brittany became a lay peerage of the France in 1297 and was formally recognised as a duchy (rather than a county) by the French court.

The Dreux rulers of Brittany descending from Peter used a canton ermine to mark them as cadets of the House of Dreux. Sometime in 1316, John III, Duke of Brittany adopted the plain ermine as the arms of the Duchy of Brittany.

At the death of John III in 1341, the succession to the duchy was contested by the duke's niece, Joan of Penthièvre, daughter of his full-brother, and John of Montfort, the duke's younger half-brother. Traditionally, females had been able to succeed as duchesses, but this practice was not consistent with most apanages granted by the French crown, which usually preferred male-only succession. Joan had married Charles of Blois, a nephew of King Philip VI, who supported their cause. Edward III of England, meanwhile, supported the Montforts. John died in 1345 from an illness caught while besieging Quimper. His young children were placed into English custody. John's son, John was allowed to return to Brittany in 1362. Meanwhile, Charles was captured by the English in 1347 and imprisoned until 1356. Charles ultimately died at the Battle of Auray in 1364, fighting the forces of the younger John.

In the Treaty of Guérande, which ended the War of the Breton Succession, the Duchy of Brittany was made hereditary in the males of the Montfort line, at the termination of which it was to pass to the males of Blois-Penthièvre. In 1420 the Penthièvre family imprisoned the duke in a failed attempt to regain Brittany. When the last male Montfort duke, Francis II of Brittany, died, the duchy passed to his daughter, Anne of Brittany.

Arms

 
Dreux